Ian Hawkins is a British military historian and author and editor of books about World War II.

Selected bibliography 
 Also, published as Courage*honor*victory

 edited by Richard H. Perry

 with Bill and Marge Braddock, editors.

1939 births
Living people
British military writers
Historians of World War II
British military historians